The 2021 Harvard Crimson football team represented Harvard University in the 2021 NCAA Division I FCS football season as a member of the Ivy League. The team was led by 27th-year head coach Tim Murphy and played its home games at Harvard Stadium. Harvard averaged 11,201 fans per game.

Schedule

References

Harvard
Harvard Crimson football seasons
Harvard Crimson football
Harvard Crimson football